The 2005–06 Serbia and Montenegro Superliga (officially known as the Meridian SuperLiga for sponsorship reasons) was the fourth and last season of the Serbia and Montenegro's top-level football league before the dissolution. It was contested by 16 teams, and  won the championship.

Teams 
Radnički Jugopetrol, Čukarički Stankom and Hajduk Beograd were relegated to the 2005–06 Serbian First League while Sutjeska was relegated to the 2005–06 Montenegrin First League after the last season for finishing last.

The relegated teams were replaced by 2004–05 Serbian First League champions Budućnost Banatski Dvor and runners-up Javor Ivanjica, Rad and Voždovac. The league would also join the 2004–05 Montenegrin First League champion Jedinstvo Bijelo Polje

League table

Results

Winning squad
Champions: RED STAR BELGRADE (coach:  Walter Zenga)

Players (league matches/league goals)
  Milan Dudić (28/3)
  Aleksandar Luković (27/3)
  Boško Janković (26/12)
  Nenad Kovačević (25/1)
  Dušan Basta (25/0)
  Milan Purović (24/11)
  Nikola Žigić (23/12)
  Dejan Milovanović (23/2)
  Vladimir Stojković (21/0) (goalkeeper)
  Milan Biševac (20/0)
  Vladimir Mudrinić (20/0)
  Marko Perović (18/3)
  Nebojša Joksimović (18/0)
  Dragan Mladenović (17/3)
  Milanko Rašković (13/5)
  Nikola Trajković (13/2)
  Nenad Milijaš (10/4) signed from FK Zemun on January 12, 2006 during winter 2005/06 transfer window
  Dušan Đokić (9/8) signed from FK Voždovac in late January 2006 during winter 2005/06 transfer window
  Radovan Krivokapić (9/0)
  Ivan Ranđelović (9/0) (goalkeeper)
  Ardian Đokaj (8/2)
  Bojan Miladinović (6/0)
  Takayuki Suzuki (6/0) signed from Kashima Antlers on January 28, 2006 during winter 2005/06 transfer window
  Haminu Draman (4/1)
  Boban Stojanović (4/0)
  Dušan Anđelković (3/0) signed from FK Voždovac in late January 2006 during winter 2005/06 transfer window
  Marko Pantelić (3/0) sold to Hertha BSC Berlin on the last day of the 2005 summer transfer window (August 31, 2005)
  Zoran Banović (1/0) (goalkeeper)
  Filip Đorđević (1/0)
  Slavoljub Đorđević (1/0)
  Nenad Tomović (1/0)
  Jagoš Vuković (1/0)

Top goalscorers

References

External links 
 Tables and results at RSSSF

First League of Serbia and Montenegro
1
1
Serbia